Graviner is a British engineering company that makes oxygen (life support) and fire extinguishing systems for civil and military aircraft. The  name is a portmanteau of gravity and inertia.

History
The company was independently operational from 1933 to 1980 and is now a component of United Technologies Corporation (UTC).

Explosion suppression
In the 1930s, as the Graviner Manufacturing Company in Gosport, it made the Graviner Extinguisher, an explosion-suppression system, which operated to prevent fuel from catching fire in an aircraft crash. The system deployed the compound carbon tetrachloride, the forerunner to the modern gaseous extinguishing agents collectively referred to as Halon.

Fire detection
In the early 1950s it made a product called Graviner Firewire which detected fires onboard aircraft. The company was now based in Buckinghamshire. In July 1966 it won the contract to provide fire detection and suppression systems for Concorde. It also made fire detection systems for marine craft; it makes a well-known oil mist detector. In 1983 it provided the fire detection and suppression systems for the world land speed record car Thrust2.

In 1984 it introduced the world's first microprocessor-controlled engine fire detection system. By the 1980s, half of the world's Boeing 747s carried its technology.

In 1991 it won a contract to provide the fire detection systems for the experimental Lockheed YF-22, which subsequently evolved many years later into the Lockheed Martin F-22 Raptor, entering service with the USAF around 2006.

Nuclear energy
By the early 1960s it had a nuclear energy division.

Ownership
In the 1980s it was owned by Allegheny International. By the 1980s it was part of the same group as a similar company, Deugra, based near Düsseldorf. It was bought, with Deugra, for £24m in 1986 by RHP Group (bearings). By the late 1980s, RHP Group had become Pilgrim House Group.

The company is now part of United Technologies Corporation (UTC).
The business at Colnbrook closed on 21 December 2017. Production was transferred to a sister company, L'Hotellier in Paris.

See also
 Darchem Engineering, of Stockton-On-Tees, makes fire suppression systems.
 Pains Wessex, a former British company which made similar life-saving equipment
 :Category:Airliner accidents and incidents caused by in-flight fires

References

 Times, 31 August 1962, page 22
 Times, 30 September 1966, page 15

1933 establishments in the United Kingdom
Aircraft component manufacturers of the United Kingdom
Companies based in Hampshire
Companies based in Slough
Fire detection and alarm companies
Fire suppression
Gosport
Manufacturing companies established in 1933
United Technologies